South Cumberland State Park is a state park in the middle and southeast portions of Tennessee on the Cumberland Plateau.

The park is one of Tennessee's newer state parks, established in 1978.  It is a collection of nine discrete tracts scattered across Franklin, Marion, Grundy and Sequatchie counties, totaling approximately 30,899 acres (as of 2020).  Twelve trailheads provide hiking access to most sections of the park, which protects a series of unique ecosystems on the escarpments and in the ravines of the Southern Cumberland Plateau.  There are over a dozen large waterfalls in the park, the tallest of which is Foster Falls, in Marion County.  The Grundy Lakes unit includes industrial archaeological remains of the coal mines and coke production facilities of the Tennessee Coal, Iron and Railroad Company, as well as a stockade prison it operated that provided convict labor for those facilities.

Areas

Distinct areas contained within the park include:

 Savage Gulf State Natural Area
 Fiery Gizzard Trail
 Grundy Forest State Natural Area
 Grundy Lakes
 Denny Cove
 Carter State Natural Area (Lost Cove ["Buggytop"] Cave)
 Foster Falls
 Sewanee Natural Bridge State Natural Area
 Hawkins Cove State Natural Area
 Sherwood Forest

Savage Gulf State Natural Area has been named as a National Natural Landmark.  Crossing in and out of the park's various sections, the Fiery Gizzard Trail is renowned for its beauty and diversity.

Camping
Camping may be done at the park's Foster Falls Campground, which includes 26 tent/pop-up camper sites and 93 backcountry campsites throughout the park.

See also
Collins River

External links
South Cumberland State Park
Tennessee Natural Areas - Savage Gulf
Tennessee Natural Areas - Mr. and Mrs. Harry Lee Carter Natural Area
Tennessee Natural Areas - Grundy Forest
Tennessee Natural Areas - Hawkins Cove
Friends of South Cumberland State Park

References 

State parks of Tennessee
Protected areas of Grundy County, Tennessee
Protected areas of Sequatchie County, Tennessee
Protected areas of Franklin County, Tennessee
National Natural Landmarks in Tennessee
Tennessee Coal, Iron and Railroad Company